is a Japanese television drama series that aired on TBS in 1985. It is based on a novel by Takashi Kitajima.

Cast
 Kazue Itoh
 Yu-ki Matsumura
 Tappie Shimokawa
 Shingo Tsurumi
 Shinobu Sakagami
 Shū Miyata

References

1985 Japanese television series debuts
1986 Japanese television series endings
Television shows based on Japanese novels
TBS Television (Japan) dramas